The following is a list of notable people associated with Jacksonville State University, located in the American city of Jacksonville, Alabama.

Politics
 Ademola Adeleke - former Nigerian Senator and current Governor of Osun State in Nigeria
 Jim Folsom Jr. - former governor and lieutenant governor from Alabama
 Harlan Mathews - former Democratic U.S. Senator from Tennessee
 Elvin McCary - Republican politician from Anniston
 Hugh D. Merrill - former member of the Alabama House of Representatives
 Mike D. Rogers - Republican U.S. Representative from Alabama's 3rd congressional district

Science and Technology
 JoAnn H. Morgan - aerospace engineer,  first female engineer at NASA John F. Kennedy Space Center

Religion
 F. Richard Spencer - Roman Catholic bishop
Dr. Ronnie Reid - Worship Pastor

Writers
 Rick Bragg - Pulitzer Prize–winning writer. Author of Ava's Man and All Over but the Shoutin.
 James Joyner - Well-known blogger and political scientist.
 Robert Stacy McCain - author of Donkey Cons and assistant national editor of the Washington Times.

Athletics
 Rudy Abbott - Legendary baseball coach with over 1,000 career wins, Member of Alabama Sports Hall of Fame
Mohamed Abu Arisha (born 1997) - Israeli basketball player for Hapoel Be'er Sheva of the Israeli Basketball Premier League and the Israeli national basketball team
 Jesse Baker - former National Football League player with the Houston Oilers.
 Dieter Brock - former National Football League player and Canadian Football League MVP quarterback, member of the Canadian Football Hall of Fame
 Amy Crawford - former WCW Entertainer
 Christian Cunningham (born 1997) - basketball player in the Israeli Basketball Premier League
 Todd Cunningham - professional Major League Baseball outfielder in the Los Angeles Angels of Anaheim organization
 Eric Davis - NFL defensive back San Francisco 49ers, Carolina Panthers and Detroit Lions
 Donovan Hand - MLB pitcher, Milwaukee Brewers
 Walt Harris (fighter) - former basketball player, current mixed martial artist for the UFC
 Delvin Hughley - former American football defensive back for the  Baltimore Ravens and Denver Broncos of the National Football League and the Colorado Crush of the Arena Football League 
 Todd Jones - Major League Baseball pitcher
 Joe Kines - College football coach
Shed Long - professional Major League Baseball second baseman for the Seattle Mariners organization
 Darrell Malone - NFL defensive back for Kansas City Chiefs and Miami Dolphins, 1992–1994
 Ashley Martin - athlete who became the first woman to play and score in an NCAA Division I American football game
 Keith McKeller - former National Football League tight end with the Buffalo Bills
 Terry Owens- NFL San Diego Chargers
 Ryan Perrilloux - former NFL quarterback for the New York Giants, Arena Football League New Orleans Voodoo
 Walker Russell, Jr. - NBA player for the Detroit Pistons
 Jason Seguine - Professional wrestler (as Buck Quartermain) and football player
 Danny Willett - Professional golfer on the European Tour, winner of the 2016 Masters Tournament
 Mark Word - former National Football League defensive end who played for the Kansas City Chiefs & Cleveland Browns
 Alvin Wright - former National Football League nose guard with the Los Angeles Rams

Business
 Keith Creel - CEO of Canadian Pacific Railway

Media and Entertainment
 Rick Burgess and Bill "Bubba" Bussey - radio personalities. Burgess is the son of retired Hall of Fame JSU Football Coach Bill Burgess.
 Catherine Callaway - CNN Tonight news anchor
 Cary Guffey - financial planner, Star of the 1977 Steven Spielberg film "Close Encounters of the Third Kind"
 Jamey Johnson - country music artist. Recipient of multiple ACM and CMA Awards. Former mellophone player for the Marching Southerners. 
 Mai Martinez - co-anchor at CBS 2 in Chicago
 Randy Owen - lead singer of the record award-winning country music band Alabama. Current member of JSU Board of Trustees.
 Reynolds Wolf - CNN meteorologist and reporter
 Riley Green - country music artist. His song “Bury me in Dixie” caught the attention of record label Big Machine Records. His next single “There was a Girl” reaches #1 on multiple country music charts.

Pageant winners
 Teresa Cheatham - Miss Alabama, 1978; First Runner-up in 1979 Miss America
 Jamie Langley - Miss Alabama, 2007
 Heather Whitestone (McCallum) - Miss America, 1995

References

Jacksonville State University